Standing Boy Creek is a stream in the U.S. state of Georgia. It is a tributary to the Chattahoochee River.

Name
The name "Standing Boy Creek" is the English translation of an old Native American name.

Many variant names have been recorded:

Cheepounhuiltee Creek
Chepounhuiltee Creek
Chessethulucco
Chiponusihuili
Chucethlocco Creek
Chusethlocco Creek
Chusethuicco
Chussethlucco Creek
Douglas Creek
End Creek
Hatchauxa Creek
Hatchee Uxa Creek
Mountain Creek

See also
 Standing Boy Creek State Park

References

Rivers of Georgia (U.S. state)
Rivers of Harris County, Georgia
Rivers of Muscogee County, Georgia